Guglielmo "Gugu" Bosca (born 5 June 1993) is an Italian alpine skier.

He is the brother of the RAI technical commentator of ski races as well as former World Cup alpine skier Giulio Bosca.

Career
During his career, he has achieved two results among the top 10 in the FIS Alpine Ski World Cup.

World Cup results
Top 10

References

External links
 
 

1993 births
Living people
Italian male alpine skiers
Alpine skiers of Gruppo Sportivo Esercito
Sportspeople from Milan